The 2020 World Women's Curling Championship (branded as the 2020 World Women's Curling Championship presented by Nature's Bounty for sponsorship reasons) was scheduled to be held from March 14 to 22 at the CN Centre in Prince George, Canada. On March 12, 2020, following the recommendations of Provincial Health Officer Bonnie Henry, the event was cancelled due to the COVID-19 pandemic.

The event was set to be the first event to start gathering points towards the 2022 Winter Olympic Qualification. Upon cancellation, the qualifying process was left unclear.

Qualification
The following nations qualified to participate in the 2020 World Women's Curling Championship:

World Ranking
The World Curling Federation World Ranking tracks and lists the success of all Member Associations.

Teams
The teams were to be:

WCT ranking
Year to date World Curling Tour order of merit ranking for each team prior to the event.

National playdowns
 2020 Scotties Tournament of Hearts
 2020 Russian Women's World Qualification Event
 2020 Swiss Women's Curling Championship
 2020 United States Women's Curling Championship

References

2020 in women's curling
2020 in Canadian sports
Curling in British Columbia
World Women's Curling Championship
World Women's Curling Championship
2020 in Canadian women's sports